Used and Abused is a full-length album by the Seattle powerpop band Danger Radio. It was released on July 8, 2008, and spent one week on the Billboard 200, at number 198.

Critical reception
The Daily Herald thought that "Danger Radio manipulates, squashes and expands synths to produce a high-energy beat fest with hooks that jump beyond catchy to addictive levels."

AllMusic wrote that "snappy guitar and synth hooks abound, resting atop percolating grooves that push even the poppiest, most melodic tunes into dance-floor territory."

Track listing

Personnel
Danger Radio
Andrew de Torres – vocals
Andy Brookins – guitar
Elan Wright – guitar
Marvin Kunkel – bass guitar
Nico Hartikainen – drums, programming, additional keyboards on tracks 1, 3, 4, 6, 8, 9, 10, 11 and 13, additional instrumentation on tracks 2, 5, 7 and 12
Spencer Phillips – keyboards, piano, programming

Additional personnel
Mike Green – production on tracks 1, 3, 4, 6, 8, 9, 10, 11 and 13, programming on tracks 1, 3, 4, 6, 8, 9, 10, 11 and 13, additional keyboards on tracks 1, 3, 4, 6, 8, 9, 10, 11 and 13, additional guitar on tracks 1, 3, 4, 6, 8, 9, 10, 11 and 13, mixing on track 13
Larry Solak – trumpet on tracks 1 and 4
Adam Hawkins – engineering
Martin Johnson (of Boys Like Girls) – production on tracks 6 and 8
Mike Elizondo – production on tracks 2, 5, 7 and 12, additional instrumentation on tracks 2, 5, 7 and 12
Brent Arrowood – engineering
Serban Ghenea – mixing on tracks 1, 2, 3, 4, 5, 6, 7, 8, 9, 10, 11 and 12
Ted Jensen – mastering

References

2008 albums
Danger Radio albums
Albums produced by Mike Elizondo
Albums recorded at Sound City Studios
Photo Finish Records albums